Belfield or similar terms may refer to:

People
David Belfield (born 1950), known later as Dawud Salahuddin, killer of Iranian critic Ali Akbar Tabatabai
Fred Belfield (1876–1921), English football player 
Henry Conway Belfield (1855–1923), English civil servant
Herbert Belfield (1857–1934), British Army officer and division commander 
Levi Bellfield (born 1968), English serial killer 
Mike Belfield (born 1961), English football (soccer) player and manager
Robin Belfield, British theatre writer, director and producer
William Belfield (1856–1929), American urologist

Places

Australia
Belfield, New South Wales, a suburb of Sydney
Bellfield, Victoria, Australia, a suburb of Melbourne

Ireland
Belfield, Dublin, a suburban area in Ireland's capital, the location of University College Dublin
Belfield Bowl, an alternative name for UCD Bowl, a sports stadium in Dublin
Belfield Park, a football ground in Dublin
 Bellfield, County Westmeath, a village

United Kingdom
Belfield, Greater Manchester, an area of Rochdale, England
Bellfield, East Ayrshire, Scotland
Bellfields, a suburb of Guildford, Surrey, England

United States
Belfield, North Dakota, United States 
Belfield, Virginia, a former town now part of Emporia

Elsewhere
Belfield, Guyana, a village in the Demerara-Mahaica region of Guyana
Ontario Highway 409, a short expressway that is also referred to as Belfield Expressway

Others
Belfield FM, University College Dublin's student radio station
Belfield Estate, home of Charles Willson Peale and members of the Wister family in Philadelphia
Belfield House, an 18th-century country house located at Weymouth, Dorset, England
Bellfield (community centre), Edinburgh, Scotland